The Prey (Italian:La preda) is a 1921 French-Italian silent film directed by Guglielmo Zorzi.

Cast
 Maria Jacobini 
 Amleto Novelli 
 Alfonso Cassini
 Carmen Boni
 Ida Carloni Talli 
 Mara Cassano 
 Arnold Kent
 Renato Visca

References

Bibliography
 Stewart, John. Italian film: a who's who. McFarland, 1994.

External links

1921 films
1920s Italian-language films
Films directed by Guglielmo Zorzi
Italian silent films
French silent feature films
French black-and-white films
Italian black-and-white films